Alma mater is an allegorical Latin phrase for a university or college.

Alma mater may also refer to:

Organizations
 Alma Mater Society of Queen's University, the central undergraduate student government of Queen's University in Kingston, Ontario, Canada
 Alma Mater Society of the University of British Columbia, the complete student government of the University of British Columbia, Vancouver, Canada

Universities
 Alma Mater Europaea, an international university founded by the European Academy of Sciences and Arts, with headquarters in Salzburg, Austria
 Alma Mater Studiorum ("Nourishing mother of studies"), the name of the University of Bologna, Italy

Art, entertainment, and media

Music

School songs
 Alma mater (song), the official song or anthem of a school, college, or university
 "Alma Mater" (Dartmouth College), the official school song of Dartmouth College, New Hampshire, US
"Alma Mater" (University of Chicago), the official school song of the University of Chicago, Illinois, US
 "Hail Alma Mater", the informal title of "Marquette University Anthem," a formal school song of Marquette University, Wisconsin, US
 "Hail Alma Mater", a formal school song of McGill University, Montreal, Quebec, Canada
 "University of Pittsburgh Alma Mater", an official song of the University of Pittsburgh, Pennsylvania, US

Albums
 Alma Mater (Pope Benedict XVI album), 2009
 Alma Mater (Stockholm Monsters album), 1984
 Alma Mater, a 2000 Portuguese album and song by Rodrigo Leão

Recorded songs
 "Alma Mater", a song on the 1972 album School's Out by Alice Cooper
 "Alma Mater", a song on B-side of the 1972 single Saturday in the Park by Chicago
 "Alma Mater", a song from Carrie (musical) (1988)
 "Alma Mater" ("Альма-матер"), a 1991 Russian song by Viktor Berkovsky
 "Alma Mater", a song on the 1995 Portuguese album Wolfheart by Moonspell
 "Alma Matters", a 1997 single by Morrissey

Film, television, and theatre
 Alma Mater (film), a 2004 Uruguayan film, nominated to the Goya Award for Best Iberoamerican Film
 Alma Mater (play), a 1971 BBC Play for Today
 Alma Mater, a 2002 American film directed by Hans Canosa
 "Chuck Versus the Alma Mater" (2007), season 1, episode 7 of the television series, Chuck
 Alma Mater, a 1934 ballet composed by Kay Swift for George Ballanchine

Visual arts
 Alma Mater (Illinois sculpture), a 1929 sculpture on Green Street and Wright Street in the University of Illinois at Urbana-Champaign, in the US
 Alma Mater (New York sculpture), a 1903 sculpture in the Columbia University campus center in New York City, New York, US
 Alma Mater, a painting in a 1909–16 series by Edvard Munch, for the University of Oslo

Other media
 Alma Mater, an academic publication produced by Jagiellonian University, Kraków, Poland
 Alma Mater (role-playing game), a 1982 role-playing game

Other uses
 Alma mater, the title of a papal bull issued by Pope Clement V on April 4, 1310